The men's tournament of volleyball at the 2015 Pan American Games in Toronto, Canada, took place from July 16 to July 26. All games were held at the Exhibition Centre. The defending champions were Brazil.

Teams

Qualification
The following nations qualified for the men's tournament:

Squads

At the start of tournament, all eight participating countries had 12 players on their rosters. Final squads for the tournament are due on June 16, 2015 a month before the start of 2015 Pan American Games.

Preliminary round
All times are local Central Daylight Time (UTC-5)

Group A

Group B

Elimination round

Championship bracket

Quarterfinals

Seventh place match

Fifth place match

Semifinals

Bronze medal match

Gold medal match

Final standings

Awards

Most Valuable Player

Best Outside Hitters

Best Middle Blockers

Best Setter

Best Opposite

Best Scorer

Best Server

Best Libero

Best Digger

Best Receiver

Medalists

References

RESULTS TABLE-PRELIMINARY ROUND (P4)

External links
Competition Format and Match Schedule 
Official website

Volleyball at the 2015 Pan American Games
Pan American Games - Men